Pierre-Alexis Dumas (born 4 June 1966) is the artistic director of Hermès. Under his direction, the firm has seen its biggest growth in decades, with sales of 4 billion euros in 2014.

Early life and education
Dumas' father was Jean-Louis Dumas (1938–2010), the former CEO of the Hermès Group. His mother was Rena (née Gregoriadès) Dumas (1937–2009), the Greek-born architect who founded Rena Dumas Architecture Intérieure in 1972 in Paris. His sister is film actress and director Sandrine Dumas (born 1963). Through his father's lineage, he is also the great-great-great grandson of Hermès founder Thierry Hermès.

In 1991, Dumas received a Bachelor of Arts degree in the visual arts from Brown University in Providence, Rhode Island, US, due to his parents' belief that an education in America would be an advantage for his future participation in the family business. His father had spent a short time in the buyer-training program of Bloomingdales department store in New York City.

Career
Beginning in September 1991, Dumas spent eight months in the factory managed by a branch of the Ratti family in Como, Italy, where silk has been spun since the 19th century. While there, he was introduced to aspects of engraving for printed textile, dyeing, and pattern design, particularly for women's fashion. (He also met Antonio Ratti there; the Antonio Ratti Textile Center and Reference Library is housed in The Metropolitan Museum of Art in New York City.

In 1992, Dumas joined the Hermès Group at the family firm's headquarters in Paris, and then was involved with the development of new products by silversmiths Puiforcat (founded in 1830) and crystal manufacturer St. Louis (founded in 1586), both Hermès acquisitions. The same year he took over the Hermès's public relations department. In 2008, Dumas created Fondation d'Entreprise Hermès, which supports art entrepreneurs around the world. He has been the artistic director of Hermès since 2011.

In December 2015, Pierre-Alexis Dumas was appointed president of the Musée des Arts Décoratifs (MAD) in Paris.

Personal life
In 1996, Dumas married Sophie Bouilhet, a member of the Christofle silver-manufacturing family. They have three children. He is one of the directors of the Protestant Solidarity of France and Armenia association, and treasurer of L'imprimerie d'art de Montparnasse — CFF: Centre Français des Fonds et Fondations (Endowment Fund for the Preservation of the Artistic Printing House de Montparnasse), which since 1881 has managed the preservation of lithographer Charles Alphonse du Fresnoy's work.

References

Living people
1966 births
French artistic directors
French fashion designers
Pierre-Alexis
Chevaliers of the Légion d'honneur
French people of Greek descent